Miss La La (born April 21, 1858) was an expert aerialist who served as muse to Edgar Degas and was depicted in his 1879 painting Miss La La at the Cirque Fernando. She was also depicted in a poster for the Folies Bergère. She was the star of Troupe Kaira, a traveling circus act, and performed with the Cirque Fernando, based in Montmartre.

Early life
La La was born either Anna Olga Albertina Brown or Olga Brown
in the former German/Prussian territory of Szczecin to a black father and white mother.

Career
La La began touring as a child, approximately around age nine, when her mother placed her in the circus. She used multiple stage names throughout her career including Olga the Negress, Venus of the Tropics, African Princess, and Olga the Mulatto. She was also billed as La Femme Canon, La Mulatresse-Canon, and Black Venus. She played venues such as the Folies Bergère in Paris, the Royal Aquarium in London, and the Gaiety Theatre in Manchester. With Troupe Kaira, La La performed a flying trapeze and human cannon ball act. One of her signature acts involved being "pulled up to the height of the circus tent by biting down on a rope." The feat was performed at the height of 200 feet. Another signature stunt involved hoisting other people or a 200-pound cannon with her teeth. She was also known for her stunt of being hoisted up to her trapeze by her teeth. At age 21, La La became the subject of Edgar Degas's sketches, leading to his 1879 painting Miss La La at the Cirque Fernando. La La performed up until the late 1880s.

Marriage and family
La La married African-American circus contortionist Emanuel "Manuel" Woodson in 1888. The couple had three daughters who also became performers, forming a trio called The Three Keziahs.

Legacy
La La is the subject of various articles including ones in The Guardian and the New York Times as well as the 2007 scholarly work Miss La La's Teeth: Reflections on Degas and Race. Edgar Degas's portrait of her hangs in the National Gallery in London, England. Since 1937, the portrait has appeared in a variety of exhibitions at a number of venues, including the J. Paul Getty Museum in Los Angeles and the Morgan Library & Museum in New York. In 2018, the portrait was loaned to the Weston Park Museum in Sheffield, England for an exhibit about black circus performers in the series Circus! Show of Shows. From Oct. 2018 through February 2019, the portrait appeared in Posing Modernity: The Black Muse from Manet to Matisse and Beyond, an exhibit at the Miriam and Ira D. Wallach Art Gallery at Columbia University, curated by Dr. Denise Murrell.

References

19th-century circus performers
Trapeze artists
1858 births
Stunt performers
Acrobats
20th-century circus performers
Year of death missing